The vice-president of Botswana is the second-highest executive official in the Government of Botswana. 
The vice-president is appointed by the president of Botswana among elected members of the National Assembly. The vice-president is the constitutional successor of the president in case of a vacancy. The current vice-president is Slumber Tsogwane.

Key
Political parties

Symbols
 Died in office

Vice-presidents of Botswana (1966–present)

See also

Botswana
Politics of Botswana
First Lady of Botswana
List of colonial governors of Bechuanaland
List of heads of state of Botswana
List of heads of government of Botswana
List of current vice presidents
Lists of office-holders

References

 
Vice-President
Vice-President
Botswana
1966 establishments in Botswana